Mushtaq Ahmad Tantray (born 8 August 1961) is an Indian writer, broadcaster and journalist. Currently serving as deputy director of Radio Kashmir Srinagar for news department, he previously worked as a newsreader at Radio Kashmir, Srinagar and DD Kashir.

Biography 
He was born on 8 August 1961 in Budgam district, Jammu and Kashmir. He obtained his master's degree in Kashmiri language from the University of Kashmir  He later joined Indian Information Service as a junior grade officer after qualifying Union Public Service Commission (UPSC) exam between 1985 and 86. He worked for over nine years at DD Kashir. He also worked in the Ministry of Information and Broadcasting as an IIS officer.

In 2018 be became the recipient of Sahitya Akademi Award in Kashmiri for his book titled Aakh (A Scar) which was published in 2012, consists eighteen short stories. In 2014, he was awarded Best Book award by the Jammu and Kashmir Academy of Art, Culture and Languages for one of his uncertain books.

References 

Living people
1961 births
University of Kashmir alumni
Kashmiri writers
21st-century Indian male writers
Journalists from Jammu and Kashmir
Indian broadcasters
Recipients of the Sahitya Akademi Award in Kashmiri